Bruce Lindsay may refer to:

 Bruce Lindsay (footballer) (born 1961), former Australian rules footballer
 Bruce Lindsay (broadcaster) (born 1950), news reporter with KSL TV in Salt Lake City
 Bruce G. Lindsay (1947–2015), American statistician

See also
 Robert Bruce Lindsay (1900–1985), American physicist and physics professor
 Bruce Lindsey, CEO of the William J. Clinton Foundation